Pacific Football Club is a Canadian professional soccer club based in Greater Victoria, British Columbia. The club competes in the Canadian Premier League, playing home matches at Starlight Stadium located in Langford.

History
On May 5, 2018, "Port City FC" was one of four groups accepted by the Canadian Soccer Association for professional club membership, along with groups that would become Cavalry FC, HFX Wanderers, and York9. Port City was the only one of the four that was not identified with a specific city, and represented an as-of-yet undetermined location in British Columbia. The group was expected to launch a team in either Greater Victoria or Surrey, British Columbia. Former professional player Rob Friend, who grew up in British Columbia, was pictured as a representative of the region. On June 1, the Canadian Premier League granted the Port City ownership group a club on Vancouver Island.

Pacific FC was officially unveiled on July 20 as the seventh team to join the Canadian Premier League. As well as confirming its place in the league for the 2019 launch season, the club also revealed its crest, colours and branding. Former Denmark international Michael Silberbauer was announced as the first head coach on August 20.

They played their first competitive game on April 28, 2019, defeating visitors HFX Wanderers 1–0 with Hendrik Starostzik scoring the only goal and Mark Village keeping a clean sheet. The club parted ways with Silberbauer on October 18, 2019, and announced then-assistant coach James Merriman as interim head coach.

On August 26, 2021, they were matched against Major League Soccer opposition for the first time, being drawn against provincial opponents Vancouver Whitecaps FC in the quarterfinals of the Canadian Championship. Although underdogs, they defeated the Whitecaps 4–3, becoming the second CPL club to eliminate an MLS club in the competition.

On December 5, Pacific FC won its first Canadian Premier League title after defeating defending champions Forge FC 1–0 in the 2021 CPL Final at Tim Hortons Field. In doing so they became the second team to have been crowned Canadian Premier League champions.

Stadium

The club plays its home games at Starlight Stadium. The city of Langford planned to increase the capacity from 1,718 to 8,000, but a utility pole located on the north side of the stadium has prevented any upgrades on that side. By extending the existing south stand and adding seating behind both goals as well as new standing room on the north side, the capacity was increased to 6,200 for the 2019 season.

Crest and colours
The club's branding is designed to represent Vancouver Island. The team's crest is the shape of a Douglas fir, a tree native to Vancouver Island, split into two segments, with the right side forming the shape of the island.  The tree is bordered by the ocean and includes a single chevron to represent a wave of the ocean and a 'V' that can stand for Victoria, victory and Vancouver Island.

The secondary logo is a roundel with a trident, meant to represent the strength and courage of the island, as well as the weather attributed to the Pacific Ocean. The logo also includes the motto of the coat of arms of the city of Victoria, which is the Latin phrase Semper Liber, which translates to "Forever Free".

The official club colours are purple, teal, and white (branded by the club as "starfish purple", "lagoon blue", and "lighthouse white"). These colours symbolize the native Pisaster ochraceus sea star, the Pacific Ocean, and the region's lighthouses.

Club culture

Supporters 
The first supporters group to show support for a Vancouver Island team to join the Canadian Premier League was the Lake Side Buoys, an existing group who followed the Victoria Highlanders of USL League Two. A second supporters group, called Torcida Oranizada Pacific (TOP) has also emerged.

Rivalries 

Cavalry FC–Pacific FC rivalry

Pacific FC met Cavalry FC for the first time in the Canadian Premier League in the final fixture of the 2019 Spring Season, winning 3–1 at Westhills Stadium in an intense match which saw three players sent-off. Pacific FC and Cavalry FC's rivalry intensified during the 2021 season where they met eight times across three Canadian competitions (Canadian Premier League, CPL Playoffs, and the Canadian Championship). This rivalry is also fueled by a pre-existing cultural rivalry between each team's respective province: Alberta and British Columbia.

Honours

 Canadian Premier League
Champions: 2021

Players and staff

Roster

Where a player has not declared an international allegiance, nation is determined by place of birth.

Staff

Head coaches

Club captains

Team records

Year-by-year 

1. Average attendance include statistics from league matches only.
2. Top goalscorer(s) includes all goals scored in league season, league playoffs, Canadian Championship, CONCACAF League, and other competitive continental matches.

International competition
 Scores and results list Pacific FC's goal tally first.

Player records

Most career goals 

Note: Bold indicates active player

Most career appearances 

Note: Bold indicates active player

References

External links 

 

 
Association football clubs established in 2018
Canadian Premier League teams
Sports teams in Victoria, British Columbia
Soccer clubs in British Columbia
2018 establishments in British Columbia